Sunshine of My Soul is an album by pianist Jaki Byard recorded in 1967 and released on the Prestige label.

Reception

Allmusic awarded the album 4 stars with its review by Alex Henderson stating "the restless pianist was continuing to experiment and take chances, which is exactly what he does on Sunshine of My Soul". The All About Jazz website stated "Exemplifying one of jazz’s oddballs, this remains one of Byard’s most interesting and accomplished musical puzzles".

Track listing 
All compositions by Jaki Byard except as indicated
 "Sunshine" - 9:33    
 "Cast Away" - 4:09    
 "Chandra" - 8:06    
 "St. Louis Blues" (W. C. Handy) - 6:03    
 "Diane's Melody" - 6:58    
 "Trendsition Zildjian" - 10:58

Personnel 
Jaki Byard - piano, guitar 
David Izenzon - bass
Elvin Jones - drums

References 

Jaki Byard albums
1967 albums
Albums produced by Don Schlitten
Prestige Records albums